WVNI (95.1 FM) is a radio station licensed to Nashville, Indiana and serving the Bloomington, Indiana area.  The station is owned by Mid America Radio Group Inc.  It airs a Christian contemporary radio format. 

WVNI has an effective radiated power of 3,800 watts.  The station also has a 100 watt FM translator at 107.7 MHz that serves downtown Bloomington and the Indiana University campus.

Operations Manager/AM Host is Jim Webster.  The Production Director is Logan Roberson. Former employees include Diana Nuchols, Denise Ray, Kyle Watson, Todd Youmans, Kenny Ray, Sharon Porter Phillips, Greg Snyder, John Shean & Joey Krol

References

External links
WVNI official website

Contemporary Christian radio stations in the United States
Radio stations established in 1979
1979 establishments in Indiana
VNI